Claflin doctrine is a U.S. law doctrine which states that the trust cannot be modified or terminated, even if all beneficiaries agree, if to do so would be contrary to a material purpose of the settlor.  Material purposes include spendthrift, support, and discretionary trusts.

References 

Law of the United States